Sar Mastan Rural District is in Abdan District of Deyr County, Bushehr province, Iran. At the censuses of 2006 and 2011, its constituent villages were a part of Abdan Rural District in the Central District. At the most recent census of 2016, the population of the rural district was 748 in 212 households, by which time it had become a part of the new Abdan District. The largest of its 10 villages was Sar Mastan, with 468 people.

References 

Rural Districts of Bushehr Province
Populated places in Deyr County

fa:دهستان سرمستان